Big Band Bossa Nova is an album by American Quincy Jones.

Track listing

Performers 
 Quincy Jones  – conductor, arranger
 Phil Woods  – alto saxophone
 Paul Gonsalves  – tenor saxophone
 Roland Kirk  – flute, alto flute
 Jerome Richardson  – flute, alto flute, woodwinds
 Clark Terry  – trumpet, flugelhorn
 Julius Watkins  – French horn
 Alan Raph  – bass trombone
 Lalo Schifrin  – piano
 Jim Hall  – guitar
 Chris White  – bass
 Rudy Collins  – drums
 Jack Del Rio  – percussion
 Carlos Gomez  – percussion
 Jose Paula  – percussion

Recording engineer: Phil Ramone

References 

1962 albums
Albums arranged by Quincy Jones
Albums conducted by Quincy Jones
Albums produced by Quincy Jones
Bossa nova albums
Mercury Records albums
Quincy Jones albums